Vieska is a village and municipality in the Dunajská Streda District in the Trnava Region of south-west Slovakia.

History
The village was first recorded in 1322. Until the end of World War I, it was part of Hungary and fell within the Dunaszerdahely district of Pozsony County. After the Austro-Hungarian army disintegrated in November 1918, Czechoslovak troops occupied the area. After the Treaty of Trianon of 1920, the village became officially part of Czechoslovakia. In November 1938, the First Vienna Award granted the area to Hungary and it was held by Hungary until 1945. The present-day municipality was formed in 1940 by unifying the three component villages. After Soviet occupation in 1945, Czechoslovak administration returned and the village became officially part of Czechoslovakia in 1947.

Demography 
In 1910, the village had 345, for the most part, Hungarian inhabitants. At the 2001 Census the recorded population of the village was 430 while an end-2008 estimate by the Statistical Office had the villages's population also as 435. As of 2001, 89.89 per cent of its population was Hungarian while 6.90 per cent was Slovak.

Roman Catholicism is the majority religion of the village, its adherents numbering 91.95% of the total population.

Geography

The village is situated in the south-west of the country on the Žitný ostrov (Hungarian: Csallóköz) near the town of Dunajská Streda. It lies between Bratislava, Slovakia's capital, and Komárno.

Most houses in the village are one story homes with several generations living together. In the past, up to the mid-20th century, the inhabitants were farmers and lived from their gardens. However, during the Communist period, people worked in the local state-owned agricultural cooperative (called "JRD" in Czechoslovakia at that time). Today, many of the young people go abroad to find jobs missing in the village.

The village has a soccer team, which plays on the playground in the middle of the village. The team plays in the 5th south-west league, and competes with the neighbouring village of Orechová Potôň (Hungarian: Dióspatony). On many occasions, five hundred fans attend these matches.

Address 
Vieska 168
930 02 Orechová Potôň
Slovakia
mail:obecvieska@stonline.sk

Map 
Vieska The location of the Village on a map

References 

Villages and municipalities in Dunajská Streda District
Hungarian communities in Slovakia